Glaucomastix itabaianensis is a species of teiid lizard endemic to Brazil.

References

Glaucomastix
Reptiles of Brazil
Endemic fauna of Brazil
Reptiles described in 2019
Taxa named by Federico José Arias
Taxa named by Celso Morato de Carvalho
Taxa named by Miguel Trefaut Rodrigues